David Bernard Swift (3 April 1931 – 8 April 2016) was an English actor known for his role as Henry Davenport in the topical comedy Drop the Dead Donkey.

Early life
Swift was born in Liverpool, the second of the four children of Abram Sampson Swift and Lily Rebecca (née Greenman), who owned a furniture shop in Bootle. His family were Jewish. He was educated at Clifton College and Gonville and Caius College, Cambridge, where he studied law. He then embarked on a career as a businessman with his father-in-law, J.P. Jacobs, whose company supplied all the elastic to Marks & Spencer.

Career
Swift made his professional debut on stage after being appointed as an assistant stage manager at Dundee Repertory Theatre in 1963. He made his television debut in 1964 as Theo Clay in the soap opera Compact. He appeared in many small-screen roles in the 1970s and 1980s, whilst in the theatre he appeared in the Royal Shakespeare Company's 1978 production of Henry VI, Part 1 at the Aldwych Theatre, and won acclaim for his performance as Frank Doel in the Ambassadors Theatre's 1981-2 production of 84, Charing Cross Road. In addition he played Montclair in the film of The Day of the Jackal (1973). Swift appeared as Dingley alongside Richard Beckinsale in the BBC situation comedy Bloomers (1979) and also appeared in several episodes of Going Straight (1978), the sequel to Porridge. Prior to this he had made a guest appearance, again with Beckinsale, in the Yorkshire Television comedy Rising Damp in which he played a suicidal tenant in the episode "Good Samaritans". But it was the role of irascible newsreader Henry Davenport in the topical comedy Drop the Dead Donkey, written by Andy Hamilton and Guy Jenkin, for which Swift became best known. He also made occasional appearances as God in the Radio 4 comedy Old Harry's Game, also written by Hamilton.

Alongside his acting career, Swift had an active interest in the behind-the-scenes aspects of media production, running the sound recording and post-production businesses Preview 1 and Preview 2 in the 1960s, before co-founding and managing Tempest Films in 1969 along with film-makers Charles Denton, Richard Marquand, Paul Watson and John Pilger. The company also produced documentaries by actor-director Kenneth Griffith.

Personal life

Swift was the elder brother of the actor Clive Swift, known for his role in Keeping Up Appearances, with whom he sometimes performed.  He was the uncle of the academic Adam Swift and the television personality Joe Swift and their sister Rebecca. He was married to the actress Paula Jacobs, was the father of actress Julia Swift and father-in-law of actor David Bamber.

He died from complications of Alzheimer's disease on 8 April 2016, just 5 days after his 85th birthday.

He is buried on the eastern side of Highgate Cemetery with his wife Paula.

Selected filmography

Film
 Travels with My Aunt (1972) - Detective
 The Day of the Jackal (1973) - Montclair
 No Sex Please, We're British (1973) - Inspector Paul 
 Who Killed Lamb? (1974, TV film) - Inspector Havelock
 The Internecine Project (1974) - Chester Drake
 The Assignment (1977) - Zaforteza
 The Black Panther (1977) - Detective Chief Superintendent
 We Think the World of You (1988) - Bill
 Jack the Ripper (1988) - Lord Salisbury
 Jack & Sarah (1995) - Michael

Television
 Hamlet at Elsinore (1964) - Player King
 The Avengers (1966) - Barber 
 Budgie (1971) - Sergeant Oxley
 Another Sunday and Sweet F.A. (1972) - Eric Armitstead
 War and Peace (1972) - Napoleon Bonaparte
 Fall of Eagles (1974) - Trepov
 Father Brown (1974) - Stephen Aylmer 
 The New Avengers (1976) - Turner 
 Richard II (1978) - Duke of Northumberland
 Les Misérables (1978) - Troufiat 
 Going Straight (1978) - Mr. McEwan
 Bloomers (1979) - Dingley
 Turtle's Progress (1980) (Series 2 only) - Superintendent Rafferty 
 The Bunker (1981) - Johann Rattenhuber
 The Day of the Triffids (1981) - Beadley
 Winston Churchill: The Wilderness Years (1981) - Professor Lindemann 
 Freud (1984) - Joseph Breuer 
 Bergerac (1987) - Dr. Barnard
 The Storyteller (1987) - King
 Vanity Fair (1987) - Mr. Sedley
 Agatha Christie's Poirot (1988) - Henry Reedburn
 Countdown to War (1989) - Édouard Daladier
 Drop the Dead Donkey (1990–1998) - Henry Davenport 
 Holby City (2002) - Bill Hoskins 
 Born and Bred (2004) - Euphrates

References

External links
 

1931 births
2016 deaths
Alumni of Gonville and Caius College, Cambridge
Burials at Highgate Cemetery
English male film actors
English male television actors
Jewish English male actors
Male actors from Liverpool
People educated at Clifton College
David